The 1969 All-Ireland Intermediate Hurling Championship was the ninth staging of the All-Ireland hurling championship. The championship ended on 12 October 1969.

London were the defending champions, however, they availed of the right to promotion and contested the All-Ireland Senior Hurling Championship. Kildare won the title after defeating Cork by 2-8 to 3-4 in the final.

References

Intermediate
All-Ireland Intermediate Hurling Championship